Uwe Kröger (born 4 December 1964 in Hamm, West Germany) is a musical star in the German-speaking countries of the world. Besides starring on stage, Kröger has taken part in galas and concerts, as well as making television and film appearances. He has released cast recordings and solo CDs.

Career 
Kröger studied song, dance, and acting at the Universität der Künste Berlin (then called Hochschule der Künste). Shortly after finishing his education, he starred in Starlight Express in Bochum where he became the first German performer to play Rusty the Steam Engine. Then, he starred in the Viennese and Amsterdam productions of Les Misérables, playing various roles, and he was also the Assistant Resident Director in Amsterdam. Leading roles followed in Jesus Christ Superstar, The Rocky Horror Show and Starmania.

Kröger's breakthrough performance was in the role of der Tod in the world premiere of Elisabeth, a musical by Michael Kunze and Sylvester Levay, in Vienna in 1992. Two years later, producer Cameron Mackintosh offered him the role of the American GI Chris in the German-language premiere of Miss Saigon in Stuttgart where he received phenomenal reviews.

In 1995, Kröger was cast by Sir Andrew Lloyd Webber to star as Joe Gillis in the German-language premiere of Sunset Boulevard in Niedernhausen. In 1997, he was offered the role of the Beast in the German premiere of the Disney musical Die Schöne und das Biest (Beauty and the Beast in English) in Stuttgart. He then went on to play the role of the Emcee in Cabaret in Vienna before he returned to Miss Saigon (again as Chris) in Stuttgart.

From October 1999 to May 2000, Kröger played the antagonistic Archbishop Colloredo in the world premiere of Kunze and Levay's new musical Mozart! in Vienna. In June 2000, he played the Pharaoh in Joseph and the Amazing Technicolor Dreamcoat at the Raimund Theater in Vienna.

In October 2000, Kröger had his West End debut with the title role of the European premiere of Napoleon at the Shaftesbury Theatre in London. In 2001, he returned to the part der Tod for the German premiere of Elisabeth at the Colosseum Theater in Essen. That year, he also starred in his first operetta; he played Felix in Ralph Benatzky's comedy Bezauberndes Fräulein (The Charming Young Lady in English) in Vienna.

In the summer of 2003, Kröger could be seen in Amstetten as Burrs in the German-language premiere of the off-Broadway musical The Wild Party.

He took on the part of Javert in Les Misérables in the Theater des Westens in Berlin. In January 2004, he went on tour with his colleagues Pia Douwes, Marika Lichter, Viktor Gernot and Anna Maria Kaufmann in the concert production of "Musical Moments". He also could be heard on the German version of Andrew Lloyd Webber's The Phantom of the Opera as the Phantom. In May 2004, he held two concerts, "Uwe Kröger in Concert" and "Uwe Kröger and Friends" in his hometown of Hamm.

In June 2004, he traveled to Japan to guest-perform in a concert tour "Diva 2004" with Japanese musical star Maki Ichiro. In November the year, he performed in the gala "Best of Musical" in Köln with other well-known German musical stars.

From 16 December 2004 to the end of February 2005, Kröger starred as Burrs again in The Wild Party, this time in Klagenfurt. In February 2005, he continued one of his famous concert series with the new tour "Musical Moments 2."

Kröger then took on the role of Cardinal Richelieu in the German-language premiere of die Drei Musketiere [The Three Musketeers in English; Drie Musketiers in Dutch (original language)] in Berlin until January 2006. Between February and April 2006, he toured Germany with the gala "Best of Musical 2006". From May to July, Kröger was able to reprise his role as the Phantom, this time on stage in Essen.

From September 2006 until the end of 2007, Kröger performed in the Kunze and Levay production Rebecca in Vienna as male lead, Maxim de Winter. In August 2007, he took on the role of Abraham Van Helsing in a production of Dracula, the Musical as part of the Musical Festival Graz.

In 2008, he returned to Berlin to perform the role of Death again in the tour production of Elisabeth.

His first solo CD was Boulevard der Sehnsucht ("Boulevard of Longing" in English). His next CD, Favourites, included a duet with Belgian star Helmut Lotti. Kröger also appeared with Pia Douwes, Marika Lichter and Viktor Gernot in the concert series "In Love with Musical" and "Still in Love with Musical", which continued with a new production and recording, "In Love with Musical Again".

Kröger's single CD You Saved My Life (2002) was dedicated to "Licht ins Dunkel" and the flood victims in Austria. In 2003, his CD From Broadway to Hollywood was released. 2004 saw another release in his single "All I Want", and in 2005, Wild Party appeared. His newest album, Uwe! Das Beste aus 20 Jahren, was released on 7 November 2006.

One of his honors include an IMAGE Award for his work in Sunset Boulevard. He was voted "Best Male Actor" and "Best Male Musical Voice" three times by readers of Da Capo magazine. He was ranked "Musical Star Number 1" for the tenth time in 2005 by readers of the magazine Musicals.

Personal life 
Kröger is openly gay and was in a relationship with Dr. Christopher Wolf, a cardiologist, for over twenty years.  They split amicably in November 2015, and he has now been in a relationship with Kiko Marin Tomas, a model and fitness trainer, for over a year. They live together in Barcelona. They got married on 8-10-2022.

Musical engagements 
 September 1988 – June 1989, Starlight Express, Rusty and Flat Top, Bochum
 July 1989 – April 1990, Les Misérables, Marius, Enjolras, and Swing, Vienna
 May–August 1990, Jesus Christ Superstar, Jesus and Annas, Schwäbisch Hall
 February–October 1991, Les Misérables, Enjolras, Feuilly, assistant resident director, Amsterdam
 December 1991 – June 1992, Starmania, Ziggy, Essen
 September–December 1992, Jesus Christ Superstar, Jesus, Regensburg
 September 1992 – October 1994, Elisabeth, der Tod, Vienna
 September–October 1993, The Rocky Horror Show, Frank'n Furter, Vienna
 December 1994 – November 1995, Miss Saigon, Chris, Stuttgart
 December 1995 – August 1997, Sunset Boulevard, Joe Gillis, Niedernhausen
 December 1996 – January 1997, Elisabeth, der Tod, Vienna
 December 1997 – February 1999, Die Schöne und das Biest, Beast, Stuttgart
 December 1998 – January 1999, Cabaret, Emcee, Vienna
 April–July 1999, Miss Saigon, Chris, Stuttgart
 October 1999 – May 2000, Mozart!, Archbishop Colloredo, Vienna
 June–July 2000, Joseph and the Amazing Technicolor Dreamcoat, Pharaoh, Vienna
 October 2000 – February 2001, Napoleon, Napoléon, London
 March 2001 – June 2003, Elisabeth, der Tod, Essen
 August 2001, July–August 2002, Bezauberndes Fräulein, Felix, Vienna
 July–August 2003, The Wild Party, Burrs, Amstetten
 September 2003 – December 2004, Les Misérables, Javert, Berlin
 December 2004 – February 2005, The Wild Party, Burrs, Klagenfurt
 April 2005 – January 2006, 3 Musketiere, Cardinal Richelieu, Berlin
 May–July 2006, Das Phantom der Oper, Phantom, Essen
 September 2006 – December 2007, Rebecca, Maxim de Winter, Vienna
 August 2007, Dracula, the Musical, Abraham Van Helsing, Graz
 April–August 2008, Elisabeth, der Tod, Berlin
 September 2008 – December 2008, Rebecca, Maxim de Winter, Vienna
 February 2009–Present, Rudolf: Affaire Mayerling, Count Taaffe, Vienna
 October 2010, Kim Junsu's Musical Concert, South Korea
 October 2011, The Sound of Music, Baron von Trapp, Salzburg, Salzburger Landestheater

Discography 
 1991, Les Misérables original Amsterdam cast recording
 1992, Elisabeth original Vienna cast recording
 1992, Die Schatten werden länger, Maxi-CD
 1993, Musical? Oh My God, original Vienna cast recording
 1993, Highlights – Die faszinierende Welt..., sampler
 1993, Treffpunkt Geisterbahn, original Vienna cast recording
 1993, Music from the Heart of Europe – The Wind Beneath My Wings, Sampler
 1994, Boulevard der Sehnsucht, solo album
 1994, Siebzehn Stufen, Maxi-CD
 1994, Böse Jungs, Maxi-CD
 1994, Peter Weck präsentiert..., sampler
 1995, Miss Saigon, original Stuttgart cast recording
 1995, Musical Christmas in Vienna, sampler
 1995, Living Water, sampler
 1996, Sunset Boulevard, original Niedernhausen cast recording
 1996, In Love with Musical, sampler
 1996, Favourites, solo album
 1997, Still in Love with Musical, sampler
 1997, Musical Musical, sampler
 1997, Die Schöne und das Biest (pop version), sampler
 1998, Die Schöne und das Biest, original Stuttgart cast recording
 1998, Elisabeth – Musik einer Epoche, sampler
 1998, Kaiserin Elisabeth Melodien, sampler
 1998, Highlights of Cabaret and More Vienna cast recording
 1999, Mozart!, original Vienna cast recording
 1999, Alles Musical, sampler
 1999, Music of the Night sampler
 2000, Only the Best, solo album
 2000, Die fantastische Welt der Musicals – Die Highlights der deutschen Originalaufnahmen, sampler
 2000, Viktor Gernot presents: Alles Musical – Vol. 2, sampler
 2001, Elisabeth, Maxi-CD
 2001, Elisabeth, original Essen cast recording
 2001, In Love with Musical Again, sampler
 2002, Musical Moments, solo album
 2002, Arena der Stars, sampler
 2002, Bezauberndes Fräulein, Vienna cast recording
 2002, You Saved My Life, solo album
 2002, Elisabeth – 10th Anniversary Concert, live recording
 2002, Musical Moments Vol. 2, sampler
 2003, ORF Willkommen Österreich, sampler
 2003, From Broadway to Hollywood, solo album
 2004,  Musicalstars singen ABBA-Hits!, sampler
 2004, Von Augenblick zu Augenblick, identical to From Broadway to Hollywood
 2004, All I Want, single album
 2004, Best of Musical!, sampler
 2004, Das Phantom der Oper, German film soundtrack
 2005, 3 Musketiere, original Berlin cast recording
 2005, The Wild Party, Maxi-CD
 2005,  Die größten Musical-Hits, sampler
 2005, MUSICAL STARS, sampler
 2005, Stärker, by Marciel
 2006, Nur das Beste – die schönsten Musicalhits, sampler
 2006, MUSICAL STARS Vol. 2, sampler
 2006, HANDS of LOVE, benefit single CD
 2006, Zeitlos, by Marika Lichter
 2006, Best of Musical Vol. 2, sampler
 2006, Uwe! – Das Beste aus 20 Jahren, solo album
 2006, Rebecca, original Vienna cast recording
 2007, Rebecca: Gesamtaufnahme, two-disc Vienna cast recording
 2008, Dracula original Graz cast recording
 2009, Rudolf – Affaire Mayerling original Vienna cast recording

Awards 
 Best Young Actor 1996, awarded by the Austrian stage magazine Bühne
 IMAG. Award 1997, Best Male Actor, for Joe Gillis in Sunset Boulevard
 Number 1 Austrian Musical Performer 2000, elected by the readers of Bühne magazine
 Number 1 Musical Performer 2001, elected by the readers of the German magazine Musicals
 Best Actor 2003, 2004, 2005, elected by the readers of the German musical magazine Da Capo
 Number 1 German-speaking Musical Performer 2006, elected for the tenth time by readers of the German magazine Musicals

References

External links 

  (in German)
 International Uwe Kröger Club (in German and English)

1964 births
English-language singers from Germany
German male musical theatre actors
German male singers
German gay musicians
German LGBT singers
Living people
People from Hamm
Recipients of the Decoration of Honour for Services to the Republic of Austria
20th-century LGBT people
21st-century LGBT people